Cratosilis denticollis is a species of soldier beetle belonging to the family Cantharidae.

Description
These small insects have a black head and a reddish pronotum, while elytrae are brownish and coarsely punctured deep. Pronotum rear corners are sharply angled (hence the Latin name denticollis, meaning toothed neck.

Habitat
These beetles can be found from June to September in mountain and alpine areas, in forest edges, river meadows and grass heaths.

Distribution
This species is present in Austria, Belgium, Czech Republic, France, Germany, Italy, Poland, Romania, Slovakia and Ukraine.

References

Beetles of Europe
Cantharidae
Beetles described in 1844
Taxa named by Theodor Emil Schummel